Bermondsey by-election may refer to one of two parliamentary by-elections for the British House of Commons constituency of Bermondsey, in South London:

 1909 Bermondsey by-election, following the death of George Cooper
 1983 Bermondsey by-election, following the resignation of Bob Mellish. Won by the Liberal Party with a huge swing.

See also 
Bermondsey (UK Parliament constituency)